Corinna Jane Adam (31 January 1937 – 8 March 2012), also known by her married name Corinna Ascherson, was a British journalist, particularly for the New Statesman, The Guardian, and The Observer. According to her obituary in  The Times, Adam was "admired for her shrewd and well-observed reporting on a wide range of subjects, not least of court cases relating to questions of freedom of expression and human rights."

Early life
Adam was born on 31 January 1937 at 40B Rosslyn Hill, Hampstead, London, the daughter of Kenneth Adam (1908–1978), a journalist and the first director of BBC Television, and his wife, Ruth Augusta Adam, née King (1907–1977), a feminist writer. Adam was educated at Ashford Girls' School, followed by a degree from Cambridge University in economics (having changed subject from French and Spanish) having studied at Girton College, Cambridge.

Career
Throughout the 1960s and 1970s, Adam wrote on a wide range of subjects for the New Statesman rising to associate editor, The Guardian, and The Observer.

Working for the New Statesman, her closest friends were "the three Marys", Mary Kenny, Mary Holland, and Mary Morgan.

Personal life
On 20 November 1958, she married fellow journalist Neal Ascherson at St Bride's Church, Fleet Street, London.  They had two daughters, Marina, a musician (born 1960), and Isobel, a criminal barrister (born 1964). They separated in 1974, and divorced in 1982. She began a 30-year relationship with fellow New Statesman journalist Anthony Howard, but Howard never left his wife.

Later life
Adam died on 8 March 2012, in a fire at her home in Rhyl Street, Kentish Town, north London, and was survived by her two daughters. Eight fire crews fought the fire, which "may have been started by a lit cigarette".

References

External links

1937 births
2012 deaths
British women journalists
Alumni of Girton College, Cambridge
The Guardian journalists
The Observer people
Accidental deaths in London
Deaths from fire